Slovak ,  is a West Slavic language of the Czech–Slovak group, written in Latin script. It is part of the Indo-European language family, and is one of the Slavic languages, which are part of the larger Balto-Slavic branch. Spoken by approximately 5 million people as a native language, primarily ethnic Slovaks, it serves as the official language of Slovakia and one of the 24 official languages of the European Union.

Slovak is closely related to Czech, to the point of mutual intelligibility to a very high degree, as well as Polish. Like other Slavic languages, Slovak is a fusional language with a complex system of morphology and relatively flexible word order. Its vocabulary has been extensively influenced by Latin and German and other Slavic languages.

The Czech–Slovak group developed within West Slavic in the high medieval period, and the standardization of Czech and Slovak within the Czech–Slovak dialect continuum emerged in the early modern period. In the later mid-19th century, the modern Slovak alphabet and written standard became codified by Ľudovít Štúr and reformed by Martin Hattala. The Moravian dialects spoken in the western part of the country along the border with the Czech Republic are also sometimes classified as Slovak, although some of their western variants are closer to Czech; they nonetheless form the bridge dialects between the two languages.

Slovak speakers are also found in the Slovak diaspora in the United States, the Czech Republic, Argentina, Serbia, Ireland, Romania, Poland, Canada, Hungary, Germany, Croatia, Israel, the United Kingdom, Australia, Austria, Ukraine, Norway, and other countries to a lesser extent.

Phonology

Slovak contains 15 vowel phonemes (11 monophthongs and four diphthongs) and 29 consonants. 

The phoneme /æ/ is marginal and often merges with /e/; the two are normally only distinguished in higher registers. 

Vowel length is phonemic in Slovak and both short and long vowels have the same quality. In addition, Slovak employs a "rhythmic law" which forbids two long vowels from following one another. In such cases the second vowel is shortened. For example, adding the locative plural ending  to the root  creates , not .

Slovak has final devoicing; when a voiced consonant is at the end of a word before a pause, it is devoiced to its voiceless counterpart (respectively).

Consonant clusters containing both voiced and voiceless elements are entirely voiced if the last consonant is a voiced one, or voiceless if the last consonant is voiceless. This rule applies also over the word boundary.

Orthography

Slovak uses the Latin script with small modifications that include the four diacritics (ˇ, ´, ¨, ˆ) placed above certain letters

The primary principle of Slovak spelling is the phonemic principle. The secondary principle is the morphological principle: forms derived from the same stem are written in the same way even if they are pronounced differently. An example of this principle is the assimilation rule (see below). The tertiary principle is the etymological principle, which can be seen in the use of i after certain consonants and of y after other consonants, although both i and y are usually pronounced the same way.

Finally, the rarely applied grammatical principle is present when, for example, the basic singular form and plural form of masculine adjectives are written differently with no difference in pronunciation (e.g.  = nice – singular versus  = nice – plural).

Most loanwords from foreign languages are respelt using Slovak principles either immediately or later. For example, "weekend" is spelled , "software" – , "gay" –  (both not exclusively), and "quality" is spelled . Personal and geographical names from other languages using Latin alphabets keep their original spelling unless a fully Slovak form of the name exists (e.g.  for "London").

Slovak features some heterophonic homographs (words with identical spelling but different pronunciation and meaning), the most common examples being   (beautiful) versus   (beautifully).

Syntax
The main features of Slovak syntax are as follows:
The verb (predicate) agrees in person and number with its subject.

Some examples include the following:
. (The+singer+feminine suffix  is+singing.)
(where -∅ is (the empty) third-person-singular ending)

. (Singer+feminine suffix +plural suffix  are+singing.)
(is a third-person-plural ending, and /j/ is a hiatus sound)

. (We the+singer+feminine suffix +plural suffix  are+singing.)
(where  is the first-person-plural ending)
and so forth.
Adjectives, pronouns and numerals agree in person, gender and case with the noun to which they refer.
Adjectives precede their noun. Botanic or zoological terms are exceptions (e.g. , literally "cat wild") as is the naming of Holy Spirit in a majority of churches.

Word order in Slovak is relatively free, since strong inflection enables the identification of grammatical roles (subject, object, predicate, etc.) regardless of word placement. This relatively free word order allows the use of word order to convey topic and emphasis.

Some examples are as follows:
. = That big man opens a store there today. ( = that;  = big;  = man;  = there;  = today;  = opens;  = store) – The word order does not emphasize any specific detail, just general information.
. = That big man is today opening a store there. – This word order emphasizes the place ( = there).
. = Today over there a store is being opened by that big man. – This word order focuses on the person who is opening the store ( = that;  = big;  = man).
. = The store over there is today being opened by that big man. – Depending on the intonation the focus can be either on the store itself or on the person.

The unmarked order is subject–verb–object. Variation in word order is generally possible, but word order is not completely free.
In the above example, the noun phrase  cannot be split up, so that the following combinations are not possible:
.
. ...

And the following sentence is stylistically infelicitous:
. (Only possible in a poem or other forms of artistic style.)

The regular variants are as follows:

Morphology

Articles
Slovak, like every major Slavic language other than Bulgarian and Macedonian, does not have articles. The demonstrative pronoun  (fem: ,) may be used in front of the noun in situations where definiteness must be made explicit.

Nouns, adjectives, pronouns

Slovak nouns are inflected for case and number. There are six cases: nominative, genitive, dative, accusative, locative, and instrumental. The vocative is purely optional and most of the time unmarked. It is used mainly in spoken language and in some fixed expressions:  mum (nominative) vs.  mum! (V),  Mr., sir vs.  sir (when addressing someone e.g. in the street). There are two numbers: singular and plural. Nouns have inherent gender. There are three genders: masculine, feminine, and neuter. Adjectives and pronouns must agree with nouns in case, number, and gender.

Numerals
The numerals 0–10 have unique forms, with numerals 1–4 requiring specific gendered representations. Numerals 11–19 are formed by adding  to the end of each numeral. The suffix  is used to create numerals 20, 30 and 40; for numerals 50, 60, 70, 80 and 90,  is used. Compound numerals (21, 1054) are combinations of these words formed in the same order as their mathematical symbol is written (e.g. 21 = , literally "twenty-one").

The numerals are as follows:

Some higher numbers: (200) , (300) , (900) , (1,000) , (1,100) , (2,000) , (100,000) , (200,000) , (1,000,000) , (1,000,000,000) .

Counted nouns have two forms. The most common form is the plural genitive (e.g.  = five houses or  = one hundred two women), while the plural form of the noun when counting the amounts of 2–4, etc., is usually the nominative form without counting (e.g.  = two houses or  = two women) but gender rules do apply in many cases.

Verbs
Verbs have three major conjugations. Three persons and two numbers (singular and plural) are distinguished. Several conjugation paradigms exist as follows:
-type verbs

-type verbs + rhythmical rule

-type verbs (soft stem)

-type verbs

-type verbs + rhythmical rule

-type verbs

-type verbs

-type verbs (typically -, when preceded by a consonant)

-type verbs (typically -, when preceded by a vowel)

-type verbs (-, -, -)

-type verbs (-)

Irregular verbs

Subject personal pronouns are omitted unless they are emphatic.
Some imperfective verbs are created from the stems of perfective verbs to denote repeated or habitual actions. These are considered separate lexemes. One example is as follows: to hide (perfective) = , to hide (habitual) = .
Historically, two past tense forms were utilized. Both are formed analytically. The second of these, equivalent to the pluperfect, is not used in the modern language, being considered archaic and/or grammatically incorrect. Examples for two related verbs are as follows:
 (I hid / I have hidden);  (I had hidden)
.
One future tense exists. For imperfective verbs, it is formed analytically, for perfective verbs it is identical with the present tense. Some examples are as follows:

Two conditional forms exist. Both are formed analytically from the past tense:
 (I would hide),  (I would have hidden)

The passive voice is formed either as in English (to be + past participle) or using the reflexive pronoun 'sa':

The active present participle (= ~ing (one)) is formed using the suffixes -/ - / -

The transgressive (=(while/by) ...ing) is formed using the suffixes - / - / -.
 (by hiding (perfective))
 ((while/during) hiding)
The active past participle (= ~ing (in the past)) was formerly formed using the suffix -, but is no longer used.
The passive participle (= ~ed (one), the "third form") is formed using the suffixes - / - / -:

The gerund (= the (process of) ...ing) is formed using the suffix -:

Adverbs
Adverbs are formed by replacing the adjectival ending with the ending - or - / -. Sometimes both - and - are possible. Examples include the following:
 (high) –  (highly)
 (nice) –  (nicely)
 (friendly) –  (in a friendly manner)
 (fast) –  (quickly)

The comparative of adverbs is formed by replacing the adjectival ending with a comparative/superlative ending - or -, whence the superlative is formed with the prefix naj-. Examples include the following:
 (fast) –  (faster) –  (fastest):  (quickly) –  (more quickly) –  (most quickly)

Prepositions
Each preposition is associated with one or more grammatical cases. It must appear in this case because the preposition  (= from) always calls for its objects to be in the genitive.
around the square =  (locative case)
up to the square =  (accusative case)
 has a different meaning depending on the case of its governed noun.

History

Relationships to other languages
Slovak is a descendant of Proto-Slavic, itself a descendant of Proto-Indo-European. It is closely related to the other West Slavic languages, primarily to Czech and Polish. Czech also influenced the language in its later development. The highest number of borrowings in the old Slovak vocabulary come from Latin, German, Czech, Hungarian, Polish and Greek (in that order). Recently, it is also influenced by English.

Czech
Although most dialects of Czech and Slovak are mutually intelligible (see Comparison of Slovak and Czech), eastern Slovak dialects are less intelligible to speakers of Czech and closer to Polish and East Slavic, and contact between speakers of Czech and speakers of the eastern dialects is limited.

Since the dissolution of Czechoslovakia it has been permitted to use Czech in TV broadcasting and during court proceedings (Administration Procedure Act 99/1963 Zb.). From 1999 to August 2009, the Minority Language Act 184/1999 Z.z., in its section (§) 6, contained the variously interpreted unclear provision saying that "When applying this act, it holds that the use of the Czech language fulfills the requirement of fundamental intelligibility with the state language"; the state language is Slovak and the Minority Language Act basically refers to municipalities with more than 20% ethnic minority population (no such Czech municipalities are found in Slovakia). Since 1 September 2009 (due to an amendment to the State Language Act 270/1995 Z.z.) a language "fundamentally intelligible with the state language" (i.e. the Czech language) may be used in contact with state offices and bodies by its native speakers, and documents written in it and issued by bodies in the Czech Republic are officially accepted. Regardless of its official status, Czech is used commonly both in Slovak mass media and in daily communication by Czech natives as an equal language.

Czech and Slovak have a long history of interaction and mutual influence well before the creation of Czechoslovakia in 1918, a state which existed until 1993. Literary Slovak shares significant orthographic features with Czech, as well as technical and professional terminology dating from the Czechoslovak period, but phonetic, grammatical, and vocabulary differences do exist.

Other Slavic languages
Slavic language varieties are relatively closely related, and have had a large degree of mutual influence, due to the complicated ethnopolitical history of their historic ranges. This is reflected in the many features Slovak shares with neighboring language varieties. Standard Slovak shares high degrees of mutual intelligibility with many Slavic varieties. Despite this closeness to other Slavic varieties, significant variation exists among Slovak dialects. In particular, eastern varieties differ significantly from the standard language, which is based on central and western varieties.

Eastern Slovak dialects have the greatest degree of mutual intelligibility with Polish of all the Slovak dialects, followed by Rusyn, but both Eastern Slovak and Rusyn lack familiar technical terminology and upper register expressions. Polish and Sorbian also differ quite considerably from Czech and Slovak in upper registers, but non-technical and lower register speech is readily intelligible. Some mutual intelligibility occurs with spoken Rusyn, Ukrainian, and even Russian (in this order), although their orthographies are based on the Cyrillic script.

Latin
 :  (stick)
 :  (monastery)
 :  (church)
 :  (shirt)
 :  (blot, stain)
 :  (school)
 :  (cupboard)
 :  (title)

English
Sports:
 : to do sports
 : sport
 : football (Association football; it can also mean American football, especially when specified as )
 : offside
 : out (football)
 : hockey
 : body check (hockey)

Food:
 : ham & eggs
 : ketchup

Clothing:
 : jeans
 : leggings
 : sweater
 : tennis shoes

Exclamations:
 : fine
 : super
: OK

German

Nouns:
 :  (rubbish)
 :  (guild)
 :  (goal/target)
 :  (tin)
 :  (blanket)
 :  (wire)
 :  (coat-of-arms, from "to inherit")
 :  (falsity)
 :  (color)
 :  (carnival)
 :  (viola)
 :  (bottle)
 :  (load)
 :  (count)
 :  (hook)
 :  (helmet)
 :  (hand plane)
 :  (funfair)
 :  (dumpling)
 :  (coin)
 :  (verdict)
 :  (stocking)
 :  (sheet metal)
 :  (shelf)
 :  (backpack)
 :  (pipe)
 :  (knight)
 :  (mine shaft)
 :  (roof shingle)
 :  (cord)
 :  (purse)
 :  (topic)
 :  (bathtub)
 :  (Christmas)
 :  (flake)
 :  (cesspit)

Verbs:
 :  (to study (as in, to major in))
 :  (to wish)
 Note: colloquially, the standard term in Slovak is 

Greetings:

 is commonly used as a greeting or upon parting in Slovak-speaking regions and some German-speaking regions, particularly Austria.  is also commonly used upon parting in these regions.

Hungarian
Hungarians and Slovaks have had a language interaction ever since the settlement of Hungarians in the Carpathian area. Hungarians also adopted many words from various Slavic languages related to agriculture and administration, and a number of Hungarian loanwords are found in Slovak. Some examples are as follows:
"rumour": Slovak , Hungarian ;
"camel": Slovak , Hungarian ;
"ditch": Slovak , Hungarian ;
"glass": Slovak , Hungarian ;

Dialects

There are many Slovak dialects, which are divided into the following four basic groups:
Eastern Slovak dialects (in Spiš, Šariš, Zemplín and Abov)
Central Slovak dialects (in Liptov, Orava, Turiec, Tekov, Hont, Novohrad, Gemer and around Zvolen.)
Western Slovak dialects (in remaining Slovakia: Trenčín, Trnava, Nitra, Záhorie)
Lowland (dolnozemské) Slovak dialects (outside Slovakia in the Pannonian Plain in Serbian Vojvodina, and in southeastern Hungary, western Romania, and the Croatian part of Syrmia)

The fourth group of dialects is often not considered a separate group, but a subgroup of Central and Western Slovak dialects (see e.g. Štolc, 1968), but it is currently undergoing changes due to contact with surrounding languages (Serbo-Croatian, Romanian, and Hungarian) and long-time geographical separation from Slovakia (see the studies in Zborník Spolku vojvodinských slovakistov, e.g. Dudok, 1993).

The dialect groups differ mostly in phonology, vocabulary, and tonal inflection. Syntactic differences are minor. Central Slovak forms the basis of the present-day standard language. Not all dialects are fully mutually intelligible. It may be difficult for an inhabitant of the western Slovakia to understand a dialect from eastern Slovakia and the other way around.

The dialects are fragmented geographically, separated by numerous mountain ranges. The first three groups already existed in the 10th century. All of them are spoken by the Slovaks outside Slovakia, and central and western dialects form the basis of the lowland dialects (see above).

The western dialects contain features common with the Moravian dialects in the Czech Republic, the southern central dialects contain a few features common with South Slavic languages, and the eastern dialects a few features common with Polish and the East Slavonic languages (cf. Štolc, 1994). Lowland dialects share some words and areal features with the languages surrounding them (Serbo-Croatian, Hungarian, and Romanian).

Regulation 
Standard Slovak is defined by an Act of Parliament on the State Language of the Slovak Republic (language law). According to this law, Ministry of Culture approves and publishes the codified form of Slovak based on the judgment of specialised Slovak linguistic institutes and specialists in the area of the state language. This is traditionally Ľudovit Štúr Institute of Linguistics, which is part of the Slovak Academy of Sciences. In practice, Ministry of Culture publishes a document that specifies authoritative reference books for standard Slovak usage, which is called '' (codification handbook). Current regulation was published on 15 March 2021. There are four such publications:
 '', 2013; (grammar rules)
 '', 2020; (dictionary)
 '', 2009; (pronunciation)
 '', 1966; (morphology)

See also
Slovak orthography
Slovak phonology
Slovak declension
List of language regulators for a list of languages with a regulated standard variety

References

Bibliography

Dudok, D. (1993) Vznik a charakter slovenských nárečí v juhoslovanskej Vojvodine [The emergence and character of the Slovak dialects in Yugoslav Vojvodina]. Zborník spolku vojvodinských slovakistov 15. Nový Sad: Spolok vojvodinských slovakistov, pp. 19–29.
 
 
Musilová, K. and Sokolová, M. (2004) Funkčnost česko-slovenských kontaktových jevů v současnosti [The functionality of Czech-Slovak contact phenomena in the present-time]. In Fiala, J. and Machala, L. (eds.) Studia Moravica I (AUPO, Facultas Philosophica Moravica 1). Olomouc: Univerzita Palackého v Olomouci, pp. 133–146.
Nábělková, M. (2003) Súčasné kontexty slovensko-českej a česko-slovenskej medzijazykovosti [Contemporary contexts of the Slovak-Czech and Czech-Slovak interlinguality]. In Pospíšil, I. – Zelenka, M. (eds.) Česko-slovenské vztahy v slovanských a středoevropských souvislostech (meziliterárnost a areál). Brno: ÚS FF MU, pp. 89–122.
Nábělková, M. (2006) V čom bližšie, v čom ďalej... Spisovná slovenčina vo vzťahu k spisovnej češtine a k obecnej češtine [In what closer, in what further... Standard Slovak in relation to Standard Czech and Common Czech]. In Gladkova, H. and Cvrček, V. (eds.) Sociální aspekty spisovných jazyků slovanských. Praha: Euroslavica, pp. 93–106.
Nábělková, M. (2007) Closely related languages in contact: Czech, Slovak, "Czechoslovak". International Journal of the Sociology of Language 183, pp. 53–73.
Nábělková, M. (2008) Slovenčina a čeština v kontakte: Pokračovanie príbehu. [Slovak and Czech in Contact: Continuation of the Story]. Bratislava/Praha: Veda/Filozofická fakulta Univerzity Karlovy. 364 pp., 
 
Sloboda, M. (2004) Slovensko-česká (semi)komunikace a vzájemná (ne)srozumitelnost [Slovak-Czech (semi)communication and the mutual (un)intelligibility]. Čeština doma a ve světě XII, No. 3–4, pp. 208–220.
Sokolová, M. (1995) České kontaktové javy v slovenčine [Czech contact phenomena in Slovak]. In Ondrejovič, S. and Šimková, M. (eds.) Sociolingvistické aspekty výskumu súčasnej slovenčiny (Sociolinguistica Slovaca 1). Bratislava: Veda, pp. 188–206.
Štolc, Jozef (1968) Reč Slovákov v Juhoslávii I.: Zvuková a gramatická stavba [The speech of the Slovaks in Yugoslavia: phonological and grammatical structure]. Bratislava: Vydavateľstvo Slovenskej akadémie vied.
Štolc, Jozef (1994) Slovenská dialektológia [Slovak dialectology]. Ed. I. Ripka. Bratislava: Veda.

Further reading

External links

Ľ. Štúr Institute of Linguistics – Slovak Academy of Sciences
Slovak National Corpus
Slovak Monolingual Dictionaries
Slovake.eu – Online Language Course
Online Translation Dictionaries
E-Slovak – Online Language Course
Slovak Language Lessons for Beginners

 
Languages of Slovakia
Languages of the Czech Republic
Languages of Hungary
Languages of Serbia
Subject–verb–object languages
West Slavic languages
Slavic languages written in Latin script